Angela McHale (born 1972 in London, England) is an English actress and comedian, particularly well known for her variety of British television roles including roles in Not Going Out, The Catherine Tate Show and Grange Hill.

Career
McHale went to St Anne's convent school for girls in Ealing, London and St Benedict's School, Ealing for 6th form. On her release, she went to Warwick University to read Politics and discovered her vocation. She then went on to study drama at the Drama Studio London. Her work with comedians Catherine Tate and Lee Mack has singled her out as one of the most gifted comic actresses at work today.

She then later guest starred in close friends' Tate and Mack's TV shows, The Catherine Tate Show (all 3 series) and Not Going Out. She has appeared in the latter four times, each time playing a different guest role. She has also been in Miranda (written by and starring Miranda Hart) and The Bill.  She has appeared in Doctors, Casualty, Coronation Street, Eastenders and Summer of Rockets.

Filmography

References 

English television actresses
1969 births
Living people
Alumni of the University of Warwick
People educated at St Benedict's School, Ealing